{{DISPLAYTITLE:C20H32N2O}}
The molecular formula C20H32N2O (molar mass: 316.48 g/mol, exact mass: 316.2515 u) may refer to:

 JNJ-5207852
 Methyldiazinol, or 3-azi-17α-methyl-DHT

Molecular formulas